Italia Nostra (Our Italy) is an Italian not for profit organization dedicated to the protection and promotion of the country’s historical, artistic and environmental patrimony.

History 

The organization was formed on 29 October 1955, by Umberto Zanotti Bianco, Pietro Paolo Trompeo, Giorgio Bassani, Desideria Pasolini dall'Onda, Elena Croce, Luigi Magnani, Hubert Howard, and Antonio Cederna, a small group of people drawn from the Roman intelligentsia with the specific aim of opposing the projected demolition of part of the city’s historic centre. The promotion of an approach to urban planning which preserves sites of historic architecture has remained a focus of the movement; however its interests have expanded over time to include the preservation of all aspects of Italy’s cultural and environmental heritage, and more than 200 branches have been established across the country. Successes have included the campaign that led to the establishment of the Appian Way Regional Park in 1988.

In 1989, Italia Nostra opposed the restitution of the Venus of Cyrene to Libya. The same year, after a Pink Floyd concert in Venice that caused partial historic site deterioration in the city, the Italia Nostra filed a complaint against the city's officials for misconduct and corruption. In 1999, after workers unearthed an ancient Roman villa wall while building the foundations of a new parking lot in the Vatican (nicknamed "God's parking lot"), the Italia Nostra lobbied to stop the construction project.

In July 2009, the Italia Nostra gave up on the management of the Parco delle Cave in Milan for political reasons. In 2011, the Italia Nostra raised the alarm on Venice's 59,000 daily tourists, reminding the press that the daily tourists limit in the city was set to 33,000 since a 1988 study. The organization has been a long-time opponent of large cruise ships sailing through Venice's lagoon.

In May 2019, The Italian Association of Environmental Excursion Guides and Italia Nostra inked a Memorandum of Understanding to develop a common strategic collaboration to protect and describe the Italian patrimonial heritage. In July 2019, the Italia Nostra asked UNESCO to include Venice and its laguna in the list of World Heritage in Danger. In October 2019, the Italia Nostra opposed the temporary transfer of the Vitruvian Man from the Accademia di Belle Arti di Venezia to the Louvre in Paris.

Presidents 

 1965–1980: Giorgio Bassani
 1998–2005: Desideria Pasolini dall'Onda
 Carlo Ripa di Meana
 Giovanni Losavio
 ...–May 2017: Marco Parini
 May 2017–September 2018: Oreste Rutigliano
 September 2018 – 2020: Mariarita Signorini
 Since 2020: Ebe Giacometti

See also 
 National Trust for Places of Historic Interest or Natural Beauty

References

External links

Organizations established in 1955
Nature conservation in Italy
Environmental organisations based in Italy
Cultural organisations based in Italy
1955 establishments in Italy
Historic sites in Italy